Literacy for Life Foundation is an Australian not-for-profit organisation focused on improving the literacy levels among Aboriginal Australians. It was formed in 2013 by three prominent Aboriginal leaders, Pat Anderson, Donna Ah Chee, and Jack Beetson, in partnership with leading international construction company Brookfield Multiplex, to drive the National Aboriginal Adult Literacy Campaign across Australia.

Background 
Regardless of whether they live in urban, rural or remote areas, up to 65% of Aboriginal people are functionally illiterate in English. A 2013 study suggested that around 40% of Aboriginal adults were at or below Level One on the Australian Core Skills Framework (ACSF). The minimum level necessary to succeed in most training, study and employment opportunities is Level Two or Three.

Campaign model 
The "campaign model" used by the Literacy for Life Foundation originated in Cuba as the "Yes, I Can" ("Yo, sí puedo") model and was applied in Australia to meet the needs of Indigenous communities following a three-year pilot stage managed by the University of New England in partnership with IPLAC and the Lowitja Foundation, funded by the Australian and NSW governments. By 2010, the "Yes I Can / Yo, sí puedo" model had been used with more than 6 million people in 28 countries to learn to read and write. In Timor-Leste, more than 200,000 people graduated within in five years.

The Literacy for Life Campaign focus is on helping to build a community culture that values and supports literacy and learning. The foundation works with local Aboriginal organisations, government agencies, councils, church groups and elders to contribute and build towards the common goal of enhancing literacy levels for all adults in the community. Local community members are trained as campaign coordinators and facilitators supported by professional adult educators. From the outset, the onus is on the community to take ownership and delivery of the campaign, focusing on long-term social change.

Campaigns 
The University of New England has piloted the campaign model in Bourke, Enngonia and Wilcannia in remote New South Wales, Australia with multiple intakes of students beginning 2012 until June 2014. Almost 80 people graduated across these three communities. The Literacy for Life Foundation planned to launch the campaign in Brewarrina in the second half of 2014.

Recognition

NSW State Parliament 
The success of the national literacy Campaign pilot was formally recognised by the Parliament of NSW on 14 May 2014 when a motion moved by Catherine Cusack MLC was passed unanimously.

Governance 
The Literacy for Life Foundation is governed by five Board Members, :
 Donna Ah Chee - Chairperson and Director (CEO Central Australian Congress (Chairperson))
 Professor Jack Beetson - Executive Director and National Campaign Coordinator 
 Patricia Anderson - Director (Chairperson - The Lowitja Institute)
 John Flecker - Director (CEO - Brookfield Multiplex Australasia)
 Don Aroney - Secretary & Director (Executive Director Operations - Brookfield Multiplex Australasia)

Notable partnerships 
In 2014, the Literacy for Life Foundation partnered with the Penrith Panthers rugby league team. The Literacy for Life Foundation logo appeared in the lower back position on the 2014 jersey and Penrith Panthers Executive General Manager Phil Gould attended the March 2014 graduation ceremony in Bourke.

References

External links 
 
 Jack Beetson, Hall of Fame Class of 2019  (IACEHOF) 
"Cuban initiative to tackle Indigenous illiteracy" - RN Breakfast - ABC Radio (audio) 
"From Cuba with love" - Good Weekend - ''The Sydney Morning Herald ' 

Foundations based in Australia
Organizations established in 2013
2013 establishments in Australia